The ideas of 19th-century German philosophers Max Stirner (dead in 1856) and Friedrich Nietzsche (born in 1844)  have often been compared and many authors have discussed apparent similarities in their writings, sometimes raising the question of influences. In Germany, during the early years of Nietzsche's emergence as a well-known figure the only thinker discussed in connection with his ideas more often than Stirner was Arthur Schopenhauer. It is certain that Nietzsche read about Stirner's book The Ego and Its Own (Der Einzige und sein Eigentum, 1845), which was mentioned in Friedrich Albert Lange's History of Materialism and Critique of its Present Importance (1866) and Eduard von Hartmann's Philosophy of the Unconscious (1869), both of which young Nietzsche knew very well. However, there is no irrefutable indication that he actually read it as no mention of Stirner is known to exist anywhere in Nietzsche's publications, papers or correspondence.

Yet as soon as Nietzsche's work began to reach a wider audience, the question of whether or not he owed a debt of influence to Stirner was raised. As early as 1891 (while Nietzsche was still alive, though incapacitated by mental illness), Eduard von Hartmann went so far as to suggest that he had plagiarized Stirner. By the turn of the century, the belief that Nietzsche had been influenced by Stirner was so widespread that it became something of a commonplace, at least in Germany, prompting one observer to note in 1907 that "Stirner's influence in modern Germany has assumed astonishing proportions, and moves in general parallel with that of Nietzsche. The two thinkers are regarded as exponents of essentially the same philosophy".

Nevertheless, from the very beginning of what was characterized as "great debate" regarding Stirner's possible influence on Nietzsche—positive or negative—serious problems with the idea were noted. By the middle of the 20th century, if Stirner was mentioned at all in works on Nietzsche, the idea of influence was often dismissed outright or abandoned as unanswerable.

However, the idea that Nietzsche was influenced in some way by Stirner continues to attract a significant minority, perhaps because it seems necessary to explain in some reasonable fashion the often-noted (though arguably superficial) similarities in their writings. In any case, the most significant problems with the theory of possible Stirner influence on Nietzsche are not limited to the difficulty in establishing whether the one man knew of or read the other. They also consist in establishing precisely how and why Stirner in particular might have been a meaningful influence on a man as widely read as Nietzsche.

Period suggestions of influence and possible links to Stirner 

The origin of the debate surrounding whether or not Nietzsche had read Stirner's work—and if so, whether he had been influenced by him—seems to lie in apparent similarities between the ideas of the two men as expressed in their writing. These similarities were recognized early and led many, for a variety of reasons, to attempt to determine the precise nature of any possible relationship.

Eduard von Hartmann's book The Philosophy of the Unconscious had been attacked by Nietzsche in the second of his Untimely Meditations. In 1891, Hartmann claimed that Nietzsche must have been aware of Stirner because Stirner was treated in the very book by him which Nietzsche subjected to criticism. As mentioned, Hartmann accused Nietzsche of having plagiarized Stirner. Nietzsche is also known to have read Lange's History of Materialism, where Stirner's book The Ego and Its Own is referred to briefly as "the most extreme, that we have knowledge of". Lange goes on to refer to the "ill fame" of Stirner's book. Nietzsche knew these works by Hartmann and Lange very well.

Paul Lauterbach also appears to have played a role in the origin of the association of the two thinkers. Lauterbach was a close friend of Heinrich Köselitz (Peter Gast, who was for many years a kind of private secretary for Nietzsche). Lauterbach came to know Nietzsche's work through Köselitz, and was among the philosopher's earliest admirers. He also worked hard to revive Stirner. According to one view this was a part of his project to present Nietzsche as "the great successor, developer and creative transformer" of Stirner. He edited and wrote an introduction to the 1893 Reclam Edition of Stirner with this in mind. Discussing the book in a letter to Köselitz, he wrote: "My introduction has only that one objective, to protect innocent people against it [Stirner's book] and to mystify and paralyze the malevolent, substantially with the assistance of Nietzsche". This introduction appeared in all Reclam editions of The Ego and Its Own from 1893 to 1924.

Franz Overbeck, who was one of Nietzsche's closest friends, went through the records of the Basle university library and was able to confirm what Nietzsche's erstwhile favourite student Adolf Baumgartner had claimed, namely that once he had borrowed Stirner's book (on 14 July 1874) "on Nietzsche's warmest recommendations". Albert Levy independently confirmed that Baumgartner made the claim and that Baumgartner had borrowed the book.  Franz Overbeck's wife Ida reported that during the period from 1880 to 1883 Nietzsche lived with the couple at several points and that he mentioned Stirner directly. She describes a discussion she had with Nietzsche in which he mentioned Klinger and Stirner as follows: "Ach," he said, "I was very disappointed in Klinger. He was a philistine, I feel no affinity with him; but Stirner, yes, with him!" And a solemn expression passed over his face. While I was watching his features intently, his expression changed again, and he made something like a gesture of dismissal or defense: "Now I've told you, and I did not want to mention it at all. Forget it. They will be talking about plagiarism, but you will not do that, I know."

Resa von Schirnhofer reports that in 1897 she visited Nietzsche's sister in Weimar: Frau Elisabeth wanted to hear some things about my meetings and conversations with Nietzsche and asked me, among other things, whether he had discussed with me Stirner and his book The Individual and His Property. After a little reflection, I answered that I did not remember him ever having mentioned this name. She seemed very satisfied with this answer and, reformulating the question, she insisted: whether I could state with certainty from memory that he had not named him. I felt like a criminal under interrogation by a prosecuting attorney and said I could only state that this name occurred neither in my notebook, nor in my memory as having been named by Nietzsche. She, however, came back to this question several times and always received the same answer. But this did not answer the key question as to whether Nietzsche knew Stirner, because not mentioning him to me is not the same thing as his not knowing him. But that Frau Elisabeth asked me this question is very explainable, since R. Schellwien and Henri Lichtenberger had, in their studies of Max Stirner, drawn a few parallels with Nietzsche's theories.

Schirnhofer goes on to make specific mention of a public controversy at this time: Henri Lichtenberger—if I am not mistaken—visited the Nietzsche Archives shortly before I did and the question of whether Nietzsche had known Stirner's book must have been discussed intensely. Lichtenberger's book on Nietzsche, which appeared soon afterwards, states about this:
"It is certain that despite his claims to complete originality he submitted, consciously or not, to the influence of his contemporaries, and that his thinking, once stripped of its paradoxical and aggressive style, is often much less new than it seems on first encounter. Uncompromising individualism, the cult of the self, hostility to the state, protest against the dogma of equality and against the cult of humanity are found stamped almost as strongly as in Nietzsche, in an author quite forgotten, Max Stirner, whose main work The Individual and His Property (1845) is, from this point of view, very interesting to compare with Nietzsche's writings."

However, Ida Overbeck, who knew Nietzsche very well, suggests that the relationship between Nietzsche's work and Stirner's should not be viewed as simple plagiarism. Her view was rather that Nietzsche owed a debt to Stirner for introducing new ideas that were significant to Nietzsche in his own work: That Nietzsche and Stirner seem to us so diametrically different, and actually are, is obvious! But we are not thereby doing justice to Nietzsche and are not giving him the attention and respect he wishes and may demand. Nietzsche paid innermost attention to Stirner. He neither proceeded from him nor stayed with him. It was the simplest sense of reality that moved my husband to note that Nietzsche had known Stirner. Stirner represents a very specific element in Nietzsche, though a small one if you wish, but for Nietzsche great and significant because of the scantiness of this element which he happened to be pursuing.

Circumstantial evidence 
Claims of influence might have been ignored were it not for the apparent similarities in the writing of the two men which were frequently noted. In addition to similarities and reports by Nietzsche's close friend that he felt an affinity for Stirner, there exist three other circumstantial details which perhaps deserve mention.

The first is that Richard Wagner, who is well known as an early influence on Nietzsche, might have been familiar with Stirner's ideas. August Röckel was known to have introduced Wagner to Russian anarchist Mikhail Bakunin and all three men were involved in the Dresden insurrection in May 1849. Wagner met with Bakunin several times during this period and is also known to have read the work of the mutualist theorist Pierre-Joseph Proudhon. Stirner was often closely associated with anarchist thought. Several authors have suggested that Wagner knew of Stirner's work and some have suggested that Stirner influenced him.

The second involves Hans von Bülow, Cosima Wagner's first husband, who was a great champion and interpreter of Wagner's music. Nietzsche apparently first met him in the early 1870s when Nietzsche was frequently a guest of the Wagners and was introduced to members of their circle. Bülow visited Basel on 27 March 1872, where he and Nietzsche held long conversations. In June of that year, Nietzsche dedicated to von Bülow his new musical composition Manfred-Meditation and sent him a copy of the score. Von Bülow replied on July 24 with strong criticism of the piece, but Nietzsche appears to have accepted this criticism with grace. In any case, he did not break off all contact with von Bülow as we know that Nietzsche sent him a complimentary copy of the first part of Zarathustra in late summer or early fall of 1883. Nietzsche also sent von Bülow a copy of Beyond Good and Evil when the printing was finished in the late summer of 1886. He also wrote to Bülow as late as 4 January 1889 during his mental illness. Bülow is known to have been a great admirer of Stirner and is reported to have known him personally. In April 1892. Bülow closed his final performance with the Berlin Philharmonic with a speech "exalting" the ideas of Stirner. Together with John Henry Mackay, Stirner's biographer, he placed a memorial plaque at Stirner's last residence in Berlin.

The third is the fact that from 1 to 17 October 1865 Nietzsche visited the house of his friend Hermann Mushacke in Berlin. Hermann's father was one Eduard Mushacke, who in the 1840s had been a "good friend" of Stirner. Nietzsche apparently got on well with Eduard Mushacke. Writing to his mother from Leipzig a few days later on 22 October, he reported: "The life in Berlin was exceptionally pleasant and enjoyable. The old Mushacke is the most lovable man I ever met. We are on first name terms". One study links this newly discovered biographical detail with an "initial crisis" Nietzsche experienced in 1865 as a result of exposure to Stirner's ideas, leading to his study of Schopenhauer.

Association of the two thinkers by anarchists 

During the 19th century, Nietzsche was frequently associated with anarchist movements in spite of the fact that in his writings he expressed a negative view of anarchists. This may be the result of a popular association during this period between his ideas and those of Stirner, whose work proved influential among individualist anarchists. The two men were frequently compared by French "literary anarchists" and anarchist interpretations of Nietzschean ideas appear to have been influential in the United States as well. Superficial similarities in the expressed ideas of the two men again seem to have played a key role in this association: "Partly because of his egoistic nihilism, and partly because of his neologistic, aphoristic style, Stirner's name came to be associated with Nietzsche's, as both writers were appropriated by anarchists and other radical thinkers at the turn of the century". This association sometimes exasperated anarchist thinkers, who often viewed Nietzsche's work as derivative.

Jean Grave, a French anarchist active in the 1890s, confronted by the growing numbers of anarchists who associated themselves with Nietzsche and Stirner expressed contempt for this trend, "without a doubt, well before the bourgeois litteratures had discovered Nietzsche and Stirner, several anarchists had found that the 'Individual' had only to consider his own 'self,' his own comfort, and his own development". He went on to question the commitment of those writers who fashionably called themselves anarchists because they could recite by heart a few passages of Nietzsche or Stirner.

This association was also common among anarchists (or individualist anarchists) in the United States in the late 19th and early 20th century. In the introduction to Benjamin Tucker's edition of the first English translation of Stirner's The Ego and Its Own, the question arises again. Here, J. L. Walker notes that "Nietzsche has been much spoken of as a disciple of Stirner" and goes on to explicitly state: "In style Stirner's work offers the greatest possible contrast to the puerile, padded phraseology of Nietzsche's "Zarathustra" and its false imagery. Who ever imagined such an unnatural conjuncture as an eagle "toting" a serpent in friendship?". However, Tucker himself had sought to promote Nietzsche's ideas as supporting anarchism and one researcher notes: "Indeed, translations of Nietzsche's writings in the United States very likely appeared first in Liberty, the anarchist journal edited by Benjamin Tucker". He adds that "Tucker preferred the strategy of exploiting his writings, but proceeding with due caution: 'Nietzsche says splendid things,—often, indeed, Anarchist things,—but he is no Anarchist. It is of the Anarchists, then, to intellectually exploit this would-be exploiter. He may be utilized profitably, but not prophetably'".

Arguments against influence 

Many who have suggested that Stirner had no influence upon Nietzsche simply dismiss the idea without any real discussion. This was the approach taken by Alois Riehl, who like many later writers showed his contempt for Stirner by refusing to mention him by name. In 1897, he wrote: "It shows a still greater lack of ability to differentiate between minds, if one puts together Nietzsche with the involuntary parodist of Fichte, with the author of the book 'The Ego and Its Own'—this, however, is the same as putting together writings of a nearly unparalleled power of language and fatal strength of genius with a literary curiosity". When writers do bother to offer support for their refutation of the idea, the fact that no definite mention of Stirner exists in Nietzsche's published and unpublished writing is the basic argument against influence.

Albert Levy 
The absence of any references to Stirner was noted by Albert Levy as early as 1904 in his study Stirner and Nietzsche. This argument against influence has proven quite durable as many of the brief remarks on the debate about Stirner's possible influence on Nietzsche to be found in academic publications mention this fact and little else. However, one researcher (who incidentally feels that Nietzsche was most likely not influenced by Stirner) notes: "It is not possible to prove that someone has not read a certain book (which was available). Nonreading, unlike reading, is always a question of probability".

Levy also dealt very briefly with the fact that Nietzsche must have been aware of Stirner through the works of Hartmann and Lange (discussed above). In the case of Hartmann, he speculated that the context and nature of the mention of Stirner in Hartmann's The Philosophy of the Unconscious would not have led Nietzsche to consider Stirner's work sympathetically and goes on to add that in any case Hartmann's claims do not prove direct influence. As for the mention of Stirner in Lange, Levy suggests that because Stirner's ideas are compared in this work with Schopenhauer's, it follows that Nietzsche must have seen Stirner's work as somehow related to the philosophy of Schopenhauer. Hence, Levy proposes that if Stirner had any influence upon Nietzsche it would have come to little more than additional impetus to remain a disciple of Schopenhauer. Along these lines, he concludes that the report of the Overbecks alleging Nietzsche's affinity for Stirner arose from a misunderstanding on Nietzsche's part about the relationship between Stirner and Schopenhauer resulting from Lange's faulty interpretation.

Levy then proceeds to compare the seemingly similar ideas of the two thinkers, suggesting the similarities are superficial. According to Levy's interpretation, for example, Stirner wants to free the self from all bonds and laws while Nietzsche preaches the duty of originality and sincerity; Stirner is a realist while Nietzsche is a "humanist" who sees only barbarism beyond the frontiers of ancient Greece; Stirner has a critical mind while Nietzsche is an artist; Stirner seeks continuous improvement (for him the advent of Christianity and the French Revolution are significant milestones) while Nietzsche admires ancient Greece, sees Christianity as decadent and wants a "Renaissance"; Stirner is a "democrat" while Nietzsche is an aristocrat whose ideal state is "Platonic"; Stirner wants to liberate the self from any hierarchy while Nietzsche reserves a privileged aristocracy of originality, freedom and selfishness; and while Stirner wants to empower the spirit of opposition, Nietzsche wants to impose harsh discipline to create a beautiful race.

Oskar Ewald 
Levy was not alone. Though the details of the differences noted in the expressed ideas of the two men varied, there were others who pointed them out. In a review of the state of philosophical discussion in Germany published in 1907, Oskar Ewald suggested: Little as one may contest the importance of Stirner, who was an energetic rather than a profound thinker, still one has good cause to be cautious in comparing him to Nietzsche. Individualism is Stirner's last word, but not Nietzsche's. Nietzsche's philosophy as a whole is not egocentric. He finds the ego spun into the world, into the great complex play, which man must fashion and live from in its innermost centre, without clinging to any singular reality, not even to the reality of his own person, for the wealth of being would thus be lessened.

Georg Simmel 
Georg Simmel also felt that any apparent similarities were superficial: Here we grasp the distance between Nietzsche and Max Stirner, which cannot be bridged despite superficial indications of the sort that made Nietzsche appear to ally with the sophists. As did the sophists, Stirner holds that all objective standards and values are imaginary and inessential, ghostly shadows confronting subjective reality. Stirner would find it meaningless to claim that the ego referred to anything beyond itself or that it should be graded according to a scale of values. He represents the renaissance of sophism, whereas Nietzsche writes: "We find abominable any decadent spirit who says: 'Everything only to me!

Rudolf Steiner 
Not all who argued against influence claimed that the similarities to be found in the works of the two men were superficial. Rudolf Steiner met Elisabeth Förster-Nietzsche when he was working on the famous Weimar Edition of Johann Wolfgang von Goethe's works then in preparation under commission from the Archduchess Sophie of Saxony. She subsequently asked him to arrange the Nietzsche library and even admitted him to her ailing brother's presence. He spent several weeks in the Nietzsche Archives in Naumberg fulfilling Förster-Nietzsche's request. He also edited and wrote introductions to the works of Jean Paul Richter and Arthur Schopenhauer. Further, he was acquainted with Eduard von Hartmann and dedicated a book to him. Steiner's Friedrich Nietzsche, Fighter for Freedom was first published in 1895. In it, Steiner suggests: One cannot speak of Nietzsche's development without being reminded of that freest thinker who was brought forth by mankind of the new age, namely, Max Stirner. It is a sad truth that this thinker, who fulfills in the most complete sense what Nietzsche requires of the superman, is known and respected by only a few. Already in the forties of the nineteenth century, he expressed Nietzsche's world conception. Of course he did not do this in such comfortable heart tones as did Nietzsche, but even more in crystal clear thoughts, beside which Nietzsche's aphorisms often appear like mere stammering.

What path might Nietzsche not have taken if, instead of Schopenhauer, his teacher had been Max Stirner! In Nietzsche's writing no influence of Stirner whatsoever is to be found. By his own effort, Nietzsche had to work his way out of German idealism to a Stirner-like world conceptIon.

Like Nietzsche, Stirner is of the opinion that the motivating forces of human life can be looked for only in the single, real personality. He rejects all powers that wish to form and determine the individual personality from outside. He traces the course of world history and discovers the fundamental error of mankind to be that it does not place before itself the care and culture of the individual personality, but other impersonal goals and purposes instead. He sees the true liberation of mankind in that men refuse to grant to all such goals a higher reality, but merely use these goals as a means of their self-cultivation. The free human being determines his own purposes. He possesses his ideals, he does not allow himself to be possessed by them. The human being who does not rule over his ideals as a free personality, stands under the same influence as the insane person who suffers from fixed ideas. It is all the same for Stirner if a human being imagines himself to be “Emperor of China” or if a comfortable bourgeois imagines it is his destiny to be a good Christian, a faithful Protestant, or a virtuous human being, and so on, or is caught and held captive in orthodoxy, virtuousness, etc.

One need read only a few sentences from Stirner's book, Der Einzige und sein Eigentum, The Individual and his very Own, to see how his conception is related to that of Nietzsche.

Steiner goes on to quote several passages from Stirner discussing the "Unique One" and explicitly relates this concept of Stirner's with Nietzsche's idea of the "superman": This person dependent only upon himself, this possessor of creativity out of himself alone, is Nietzsche's superman.

These Stirner thoughts would have been the suitable vessel into which Nietzsche could have poured his rich life of feeling; instead, he looked to Schopenhauer's world of concepts for the ladder upon which he could climb to his own world of thought.

Steiner's view appears to be that the similarities between the two writers are significant and substantial, but he accounts for this with the suggestion that Nietzsche arrived at a "Stirner-like world conception" on his own. Steiner makes no mention of any of the arguments then current suggesting the possibility or likelihood that Nietzsche was familiar with Stirner's work. Variations of this attempt to account for the seeming similarity in the writings of Stirner and Nietzsche through a theory of independent parallel development can  be found in discussions of Stirner as a "precursor" of Nietzsche.

John Glassford 
John Glassford believes that there is "staggering similarity" between some of the two men's ideas. While he seems to believe that it is likely that Nietzsche read Stirner, he stops short of asserting any certain influence or plagiarism: Stylistically speaking, Stirner uses hyperbole and metaphor in much the same way as Nietzsche, although most would agree that Nietzsche's technique is the more successful. Compare, for example, Stirner's image of the state—"the state turns against me with all the force of its lion-paws and eagle-claws: for it is the King of beasts, it is lion and eagle" (1995, 226)—with Nietzsche's description of the state in Thus Spoke Zarathustra—the "State is the name of the coldest of all cold monsters" (I "On the New Idol"). Even allowing for the vagaries of translation, it is clear that Stirner's prose is more repetitive and pedestrian than Nietzsche's, and very often, as in the example just given, Stirner's metaphors just don't work.

More important, and with regard to content, Nietzsche, like Stirner, denies God (GS 125; Stirner 1996, 6–7), he rejects the traditional boundaries available to moral agents (BGE 1–2; Stirner 1995, 282), he undercuts the more plausible conceptions of truth (BGE Preface; Stirner 1995, 312), and he glorifies the use of power to settle disputes between competing interests (BGE 6, 186, 197; Stirner 1995, 175). Perhaps even more remarkable is Stirner's apparent anticipation of a sacred Nietzschean cow, namely, the critique of the modern account of freedom in which autonomy and obligation are reconciled through some mode or other of self-imposed duty. Rather, Stirner like Nietzsche, appeals to a different conception with a persistent call to authenticity, whatever  the costs (1995, xxii, 177, 149; Nietzsche, ZI "On the Gift-Giving Virtue" 3). Finally, Stirner and Nietzsche shared an obsession with the role of language and its potentially tyrannizing effects (Stirner 1995, 312–15; Nietzsche, TI "Skirmishes").

There is also a staggering similarity between Stirner and Nietzsche's political demonology. Can it be mere coincidence that Stirner, like Nietzsche, loathed the state, nationalism, liberalism, socialism, and communism? Nietzsche called all of these modern isms "little attacks of stupidity," and Stirner rather typically said of one of these ideologies, "That the communist sees in you the man, the brother, is only the Sunday side of communism" (Nietzsche, BGE 251; Stirner 1995, 110). According to Stirner and Nietzsche, then, these ideas are all based upon a latent secularized version of Christian ethics.

After reviewing the controversy as regards possible plagiarism, he suggests: "Unless new documents emerge, we will probably never be able to establish with complete certainty whether Nietzsche plagiarized from Stirner. The circumstantial evidence provided by the published writings is strong, but only if one glosses over the many differences in the published writings as well. [...] Nevertheless, I know of no other example of two philosophers whose works bear such a strong similarity, but where no debt of acknowledgement took place". Following Löwith, he concludes by offering the idea that Nietzsche most likely arrived at ideas similar to Stirner's because of the "inevitable logic of post-Hegelian philosophy".

Thomas H. Brobjer 
Unlike Glassford, Thomas H. Brobjer does not see any "staggering similarity" between the two men. He does accept some of the general similarities mentioned by Glassford in his article, but he feels that claims of plagiarism and even of influence are inappropriate. He proposes a new possible solution, namely that Nietzsche knew of Stirner through secondary works. Though Brobjer is apparently a very careful scholar, he claims "the only known secondary source that Nietzsche read [mentioning Stirner] has been F. A. Lange's Geschichte des Materialismus". He then announces that Nietzsche definitely read works of Hartmann where Stirner is mentioned at length as though he is the first to have published this "discovery". While the fact that Nietzsche must have read at least one of Hartmann's works in which Stirner was discussed is very old news, Brobjer does add at least one new secondary source discussing Stirner that Nietzsche could have read.

Arguments for influence

Anselm Ruest 
Anselm Ruest reviewed the Nietzsche controversy in his 1906 biography of Stirner and came to the conclusion that "Nietzsche had read Stirner, but withheld mention of him in his writings because he feared that while it was 'a positive philosophy which yearned for life', it was apt to be 'misused by many readers as a justification for petty crimes and cowardly misdeeds'".

Paul Carus 
Paul Carus wrote the following in 1914 about the potential relationship between Nietzsche and Stirner:

Gilles Deleuze 
Gilles Deleuze suggests that Stirner was a critically important negative influence on Nietzsche. From this perspective, Stirner's egoism was answered by Nietzsche's self-overcoming and "the theory of the higher man". According to Deleuze:

Notes

References 

 
 
 
 
 
 
 , enlarged version with express charge of plagiarism in: idem: Ethische Studien. Leipzig: Haacke 1898, S. 34–69
 
  (English version)
 
 
 
 
 
 
 
 

Max Stirner
19th-century philosophy
Philosophical debates
Friedrich Nietzsche
German philosophy